Elbing is the German name of Elbląg, a city in northern Poland which until 1945 was a German city in the province of East Prussia.

Elbing may also refer to:

Places
 Elbląg (river), on which the city of Elbląg is located
 Elbing, Kansas, a city in the US

Ships
 SMS Elbing, light cruiser of the Imperial Germany Navy
 Elbing class torpedo boat, in the German Kriegsmarine during World War II
 SS Elbing, a cargo ship in service 1934-45

See also
 Treaty of Elbing, signed between the Dutch Republic and the Swedish Empire in 1656
 Switzman v Elbling, a landmark 1957 Supreme Court of Canada decision
 Elbling, a grape variety